Sydney Harbour can refer to:

Port Jackson, the harbour of Sydney, Australia
Sydney Harbour (Nova Scotia), the harbour of Sydney, Nova Scotia